Little Girl Blue is an upcoming French docudrama film written and directed by Mona Achache and starring Marion Cotillard as Achache's mother.

Cast
 Marion Cotillard as Mona Achache's mother
 Mona Achache
 Marie Bunel
 Didier Flamand
 Pierre Aussedat
 Tella Kpomahou
 Guy Donald Koukissa

Production
On 7 January 2020, it was announced that France's CNC had granted an advance on earnings to Mona Achache's documentary project Little Girl Blue, whose production details were yet to be formalized.

On 10 December 2022, it was announced that Achache had recently filmed a docudrama about her mother's life starring Marion Cotillard as her mother and that Achache would also star in the film. The editing process started on 2 January 2023.

Filming
Filming took place in Mulhouse in the Grand Est region of France between 20 November and 10 December 2022.

References

External links

Upcoming films
2020s French-language films
2020s drama films
French docudrama films
French films based on actual events
French biographical drama films
2020s biographical drama films
Films shot in Mulhouse
Films set in France
Films directed by Mona Achache
Films with screenplays by Mona Achache